Noemi or Noémi may refer to:
 Noémie, a female given name of French origin; also spelt Noémi
 Naomi (given name), a given name in many languages; also spelt Noemi
 Noémi (novel), an 1895 historical novel by Sabine Baring-Gould
 Noemi (singer) (born 1982), Italian singer and music video director
 Noemi (EP), by Noemi
 SS Noemi (1895), a steamship in service 1926–30
 SS Noemi (1942) a steamship in service 1961–65
 703 Noëmi, a minor planet orbiting the sun
 "Noémi", a part of the novel The Man with the Golden Touch by Mór Jókai
Noémi (novel), an 1895 novel by Sabine Baring-Gould

See also
 Naomi (disambiguation)